Basilica of Our Lady or Saint Mary of the Angels may refer to:

 Papal Basilica of Saint Mary of the Angels in Assisi (built from 1569), the mother church of the Franciscan movement, in Italy
 Basilica of St Mary of the Angels and the Martyrs, a 16th-century church in Rome, Italy
 Basilica of Our Lady of the Angels, Cartago (built 1639), a Catholic basilica in Costa Rica
 St. Mary of the Angels Basilica (Olean, New York) (first dedicated in 1860), in the United States
 St Mary of the Angels Basilica, Geelong (built 1937), in Australia

See also 
 Basilica of St. Mary (disambiguation)
 St. Mary of the Angels (disambiguation)
 Our Lady of the Angels (disambiguation)